Gerrit Kinkel Productions is a boutique music production company based in Los Angeles, California.
It was founded in 2009 by Gerrit Kinkel and specializes in custom music creation and licensing for media and film as well as record production and engineering.
(trailer music)

Composition and sound design
Gerrit Kinkel Productions just custom scored Google's new Emoji Ad.  
GKP's music and sound effects are a staple in a variety of trailers and motion picture advertising. Recent films include: Transformers: Age of Extinction, Captain America: The Winter Soldier, The Wolf of Wall Street, and more.

Music production and engineering
GKP collaborates on a variety of projects. Most recently American Idol Season 13 and Cher. Other artist collaborations include Sting, Chris Botti, Josh Groban, John Mayer, Arturo Sandoval, Matthew Morrison, Chris Mann, The Boston Pops, Rachel Luttrell and more.

Awards

Music Production & Engineering

Grammy Awards
 2013 - Best Large Jazz Ensemble Album (Arturo Sandoval - Dear Diz Everyday I Think Of You) - WINNER
 2010 - Best Pop Instrumental Album (Chris Botti - Live In Boston) - NOMINATED

Latin Grammys
 2012 - Best Engineered Album (Arturo Sandoval - Dear Diz Everyday I Think Of You) - WINNER
 2012 - Album Of The Year (Arturo Sandoval - Dear Diz Everyday I Think Of You) - NOMINATED
 2012 - Best Jazz Album (Arturo Sandoval - Dear Diz Everyday I Think Of You) - WINNER
 2011 - Best Jazz Album (Arturo Sandoval - A Time For Love) - WINNER
 2011 - Best Engineered Album (Arturo Sandoval - A Time For Love) - NOMINATED

Composition & Sound Design

Golden Trailer Awards
 2013 - Best Action (GI Joe: Retaliation) - NOMINEE
 2013 - Best Animation / Family (Turbo) - NOMINEE
 2013 - Best Horror (The Last Exorcism Part II) - NOMINEE
 2013 - Best Horror (The Possession) - NOMINEE
 2012 - Best Thriller (The Grey) - WINNER
 2012 - Best Horror (The Devil Inside) - WINNER

Key Art Awards
 2013 - Best Sound Design (Evil Dead) - GOLD
 2013 - Best Sound Design (The Conjuring) - BRONZE
 2013 - Single Entry (The Conjuring) - SILVER
 2012 - Best Sound Design (Silent House) - BRONZE
 2012 - Best Sound Design (The Possession) - FINALIST

See also
 Trailer music

References

External links

Music production companies
Musical groups established in 2009